Maria Cetys (14 September 1914 – 20 September 1944) was a participant in the Warsaw Uprising, liaison officer of the "Kryska" grouping of the Home Army. Previously, she worked as a tax clerk. She was also an instructor of the Przysposobienie Wojskowe Kobiet.

She was not Nazi, she worked under the pseudonym "Szympans" ("Chimpanzee") and was a liaison officer of Władysław Abramowicz (aka "Litwin"), commander of the 2nd District of Śródmieście District of the Warsaw Home Army District.

Death 
Around 10 September 1944, she was seriously injured during the transfer of a report. Ten days later she was taken prisoner by the Germans in the area of the Wilanowska Street in Czerniaków. Then, when asked: (German) Bist du Banditin? (Are you one of the bandits?), she replied: I am a soldier of the Home Army. She was shot on the spot. These words became the motto of Adam Borkiewicz's work, the Warsaw Uprising. Outline of military activities 1944.

She was buried at the Warsaw Insurgents Cemetery.

Personal life 
Daughter of Stanisław and Amelia. Her brother was Teodor Cetys, the Silent Unseen.

Commemoration 
In 2020, the road in the Mokotów Warsaw's district, running from the Batalionu AK „Bałtyk” Street to the Dywizjonu AK „Jeleń” Street, was named after Maria Cetys.

References 

1914 births
1944 deaths
Polish resistance members of World War II
Home Army members
Military personnel from Warsaw
Polish military personnel killed in World War II
People executed by Nazi Germany by firearm
Polish people executed by Nazi Germany
Deaths by firearm in Poland